Hastings District Council is the territorial authority for the Hastings District of New Zealand.

The council covers the urban areas of Havelock North, Hastings and Flaxmere, and the surrounding settlements of Clive, Te Awanga, Haumoana and Waimarama. It was formed in 1989, through the merger of Hastings City Council, Havelock North Borough Council and the Hawke's Bay County Council.

The council is led by the mayor of Hastings, who is currently .

Composition

Hastings District Council is made up of one mayor and 14 councillors representing five wards.

The council also has a Rural Community Board, made up of four members elected from four rural community areas.

References

External links

 Official website

 Hastings District Council
Politics of the Hawke's Bay Region
Territorial authorities of New Zealand